Ford Township may refer to:

Ford Township, Ford County, Kansas
Ford Township, Kanabec County, Minnesota
Ford Township, a geographic township in Unorganized North Cochrane District, Ontario, Canada

See also
 Ford River Township, Michigan

Township name disambiguation pages